Saleslady is a 1938 American romantic comedy drama film directed by Arthur Greville Collins and starring Anne Nagel, Weldon Heyburn and Harry Davenport.  Based on the story Nothing Down by Kubec Glasmon, it was produced and distributed by Monogram Pictures.

Synopsis
Heiress Mary wants to enjoy life on her own merits and moves away from her wealthy grandfather. She gets a job in a department store and meets and falls in love with colleague Bob Spencer. When, after their marriage, they are struggling financially she is tempted to go to her grandfather for help.

Cast
 Anne Nagel as Mary Dakin Spencer
 Weldon Heyburn as 	Bob Spencer
 Harry Davenport as 	Miles Cannon
 Kenneth Harlan as Bigelow
 Harry Hayden as 	Steele
 Ruth Fallows as 	Lillian 'Lil' Clark
 John St. Polis as Crane
 Matty Kemp as 	Wheeler
 Doris Rankin as 	The Matron
 Don 'Red' Barry as 	Babcock 
 Herbert Evans as The Butler

References

Bibliography
 Fetrow, Alan G. . Sound films, 1927-1939: a United States Filmography. McFarland, 1992.
 Katchmer, George A. Eighty Silent Film Stars: Biographies and Filmographies of the Obscure to the Well Known. McFarland, 1991.

External links
 

1938 films
1938 comedy films
1930s English-language films
American comedy films
Monogram Pictures films
Films directed by Arthur Greville Collins
American black-and-white films
1930s American films